Henry Chan (born December 5, 1992) is a Hong Kong professional volleyball player and He has been to play setter for the Hong Kong men's national volleyball team.

Career
Chan played with the club from Hong Kong South China AA (for their team Nam Ching) in 2010. He then moved on loan to the Thai club RSU for the 2016–17 season. He also played on loan with the Thai Air Force in 2017 and NK Fitness Samutsakhon for the 2017/18 season.

Personal 
Chan is a Chinese professional volleyball player. He has been play setter for the Hong Kong men's national volleyball team and he is Modelling and acting. He is from Hong Kong, China. He graduated from Hong Kong High School in 2009. Chan graduated from the University of Hong Kong Gatton College of Business and Economics in 2015 with a 3.9 GPA in management and marketing and returned to study at the master's level. Faculty of Economics, Rangsit University

Clubs
  South China AA (2010–?)
  RSU (2016–2017)
  Air Force (2017)
  NK Fitness Samutsakhon (2017)

Awards

Clubs
 2017 Thai–Denmark Super League -  Runner-Up, with Air Force

References 

1992 births
Hong Kong men's volleyball players
South China AA volleyball players
Living people